Hjördis Margareta Nordin (later Hallquist, born 2 August 1932) is a retired Swedish gymnast. She was part of the Swedish teams that won gold medals at the 1950 World Artistic Gymnastics Championships (all-around) and 1952 Summer Olympics (team portable apparatus).

References

External links
 

1932 births
Living people
Swedish female artistic gymnasts
Gymnasts at the 1952 Summer Olympics
Olympic gymnasts of Sweden
Olympic gold medalists for Sweden
Medalists at the 1952 Summer Olympics
Medalists at the World Artistic Gymnastics Championships
Olympic medalists in gymnastics
Sportspeople from Lund
20th-century Swedish women